This is a list of child actors from Italy. Films and/or television series they appeared in are mentioned only if they were still a child at the time of filming.

Current child actors (under the age of eighteen) are indicated by boldface.

 List
Italy
Child actors